Helbra is a municipality in the Mansfeld-Südharz district, Saxony-Anhalt, Germany.

People 
Fritz Schenk (1930-2006), journalist

References

Municipalities in Saxony-Anhalt
Mansfeld-Südharz